Mohammad Soleimani (born ) is a former Iranian male volleyball player. He was part of the Iran men's national volleyball team at the 2006 FIVB Volleyball Men's World Championship in Japan. He played for Paykan Tehran.

Clubs
 Paykan Tehran
 Pegah Urmia
 Al-Ahli
 Erteashat Sanati
 Azad University
 Saipa

References

1987 births
Living people
Iranian men's volleyball players
Place of birth missing (living people)
Volleyball players at the 2006 Asian Games
Asian Games competitors for Iran
Iranian expatriate sportspeople in the United Arab Emirates